Neogurelca montana, the narrow-banded hawkmoth, is a moth of the family Sphingidae. It is known from central and south-western China.

The wingspan is about 44 mm. Adults are on wing from July to October.

The larvae have been recorded feeding on Paederia tomentosa.

References

Neogurelca
Moths described in 1915